A cartouche in cartography is a decorative emblem on a globe or map.

Map cartouches may contain the title, the printer's address, date of publication, the scale of the map and legends, and sometimes a dedication. 

The design of cartouches varies according to cartographer and period style. On 15th-century maps they are modelled after Italian precedent (simple strapwork), by the 16th century architectural and figurative elements (like coats of arms) are added. The cartographic cartouche had its heyday in the Baroque period.
Toward the end of the 18th century ornamental effects in cartography became less popular, their style developed to simple oval or rectangular fields with inscriptions.

See also
Cartouche (design)

External links 
 Cartouches, or Decorative Map Titles. - Feature Maps blog post(February 25, 2010).  David Rumsey Map Collection: Cartography Associates.

Cartography
Illustration